Affective design describes the design of user interfaces in which emotional information is communicated to the computer from the user in a natural and comfortable way. The computer processes the emotional information and adapts or responds to try to improve the interaction in some way. The notion of affective design emerged from the field of human–computer interaction (HCI), specifically from the developing area of affective computing.  Affective design serves an important role in user experience (UX) as it contributes to the improvement of the user's personal condition in relation to the computing system. The goals of affective design focus on providing users with an optimal, proactive experience. Amongst overlap with several fields, applications of affective design include ambient intelligence, human–robot interaction, and video games.

Background 
Emotions are an integral part of the human experience, and thus, play a role in how users and consumers interact with interfaces and products. Donald Norman, an academic in the field of human-centered design, explored the importance of emotion in design, coining the concept of user-centered design in the 1980s. He discussed design heuristics and advocated for providing users with a pleasurable experience through the application of emotional design. Similarly, Bødker, Christensen, and Jørgensen presented a definition of affective design that emphasizes the importance of considering current social and cultural influences when relating to human emotions.

Along with the growth of human-computer interaction, the past few decades have seen an increase in the discussion of emotions in relation to design. Research in recent years has looked at what affects our emotions as well as how emotions affect our mental and physical states.  Additionally, designers and researchers have explored how to elicit and map people’s emotions, ranging from positive to negative.  Affective design encompasses more than the functionality of a product as it emphasizes user experience and is concerned with the dynamics of how humans interact with the world.

Affective design includes utilizing users’ emotions as data to guide technologies’ responses in addition to designing with predetermined elements intended to influence users’ emotions. The growth in the number and diversity of users carries with it the challenge to tailor interfaces and products to each individual. Affective design offers the potential to provide a unique, adaptive response to each user’s emotion. It has emerged as an intersection of functionality and pleasure, illustrating the significant influence of emotional components in technology and user experiences.

Aims
Affective computing aims to construct affective interfaces which are capable of providing certain emotional experiences for users. Affective design attempts to understand the emotional relationships between users and products as well as how products communicate affectively through their physical features. It aims to create artefacts capable of eliciting the most pleasurable experience possible for users, across all of their senses. Affective design works to create the optimal user experience by tailoring human-interactions to individual users in response to their emotional input. It promotes affective interaction through communication, positioning itself as a mediator between human input and the computer's output.

The key challenge for affective design involves accurately identifying the user's affective needs, and, subsequently, the design of products that would address those needs. Current research focuses on the measurement and analysis of human interactions towards affective design and the assessment of the corresponding affective design features.

Applications 

Ambient intelligence (AmI) involves a variety of processes, including aspects of affective design, to construct systems that proactively interact with the user. It incorporates areas from computer science and engineering, including sensors, human-computer interfaces, and artificial intelligence, to construct an adaptive, intelligent user environment. Collecting information from the environment and calculating the user’s anticipated needs, AmI lies at the intersection of the Internet of things and artificial intelligence . Applying affective design, AmI considers human desires and emotional responses. One way AmI processes human emotions is through facial expressions, which allows the technology to recognize user emotions and respond accordingly. These electronic environments provide the users with an aesthetic and pleasurable experience by enhancing human-product interactions.

Human–robot interaction is another area in which affective design is applied, specifically with emotional robots. Recognizing human emotions, emotional robots are aware of the user’s emotions and engage in an emotional interaction with the user. Emotional robots are designed to mimic human emotions and cognition. They analyze the user’s emotions by gathering data through various methods, including facial recognition, body language, and physiological signals, and then they exhibit a behavioral response. One example of an emotional robot is Erica, developed by Hiroshi Ishiguro and his team at Osaka University. Erica is an intelligent robot capable of carrying out a conversation with people and expressing emotions. 

Video games serve as an immersive form of entertainment that can apply affective design in their development. Emotions impact the user’s engagement and relationship with the video game, prompting designers to consider affective design in their creation of video games. Affective gaming, for example, explores how video games can analyze the player's emotions and change game features accordingly. This has the potential to increase the personalization and adaptability of the games with the intention to increase user interest and commitment.

See also 

 Affective computing
 Human–computer interaction 
 User-centered design
 User experience design

References

Design
Customer experience